Mezzago is a comune (municipality) in the Province of Monza e Brianza in the Italian region Lombardy, located about  northeast of Milan.

Twin towns
 Saint-Pierre-de-Chandieu, France, since 1990
 Reilingen, Germany, since 2009

People
Angelo Colombo, former AC Milan football player

References

External links
 Official website